Trent McDuffie (born September 13, 2000) is an American football cornerback for the Kansas City Chiefs of the National Football League (NFL). He played college football at Washington and was drafted by the Chiefs in the first round of the 2022 NFL Draft.

High school career
McDuffie attended St. John Bosco High School in Bellflower, California, after transferring from Servite High School. After his senior year he was selected to the All-American Bowl. He committed to play college football at the University of Washington.

College career
McDuffie played in all 13 games with 11 starts as a true freshman at Washington in 2019. He had 45 tackles and one interception. As a sophomore in 2020, he started all four of Washington's games and had 14 tackles and an interception.

Professional career

Kansas City Chiefs
McDuffie was selected in the first round with the 21st overall pick by the Kansas City Chiefs in the 2022 NFL Draft. He made his NFL debut in Week 1 against the Arizona Cardinals. He was placed on injured reserve on September 13, 2022. He was activated on November 1, 2022. He recorded his first professional sack and forced fumble against the Denver Broncos in Week 17. He finished his rookie season with one sack, 44 total tackles, seven passes defensed, and one forced fumble in 11 games and starts. McDuffie helped the Chiefs reach Super Bowl LVII where he recorded five tackles in the 38-35 victory over the Philadelphia Eagles.

References

External links
 Kansas City Chiefs bio
Washington Huskies bio

2000 births
Living people
People from Westminster, California
Players of American football from California
Sportspeople from Orange County, California
American football cornerbacks
Washington Huskies football players
Kansas City Chiefs players